The LXV Legislature of the Mexican Congress is the current legislature of Mexico. It was elected on  6 June 2021 at the 2021 Mexican legislative election.

Composition

Senate

Chamber of Deputies 
To be elected.

Leadership 
 Alejandro Armenta Mier: President of the Senate
 Santiago Creel: President of the Chamber of Deputies

Membership

Senate

Elected by state

Proportional representation

Chamber of Deputies

Single-member districts

Proportional representation

References 

Congress of Mexico by session
2021 in Mexican politics
2021 establishments in Mexico
Mexico